Edward Bateson (2 July 1902 – second ¼ 1972) was a rugby union, professional rugby league and association footballer, and cricketer of the 1920s and 1930s, playing representative level rugby union (RU) for Yorkshire, and at club level for Skipton RFC as a wing, i.e. number 11 or 14, club level rugby league (RL) for Wakefield Trinity (Heritage No. 322), as a , i.e. number 2 or 5, club level association football for Blackburn Rovers, and representative level cricket for Lancashire, he also participated at athletics, boxing and tennis.

Background
Ted Bateson was born in Settle, West Riding of Yorkshire, and his death was registered in Lewes, Sussex.

Rugby League playing career

County Cup Final appearances
Ted Bateson played , i.e. number 2, in Wakefield Trinity's 3–10 defeat by Huddersfield in the 1926 Yorkshire County Cup Final during the 1926–27 season at Headingley Rugby Stadium, Leeds on Wednesday 1 December 1926, the original match on Saturday 27 November 1926 was postponed due to fog.

Club career
Ted Bateson made his début for Wakefield Trinity in the 8–3 victory over Batley on Saturday 19 December 1925, he appears to have scored no drop-goals (or field-goals as they are currently known in Australasia), but prior to the 1974–75 season all goals, whether; conversions, penalties, or drop-goals, scored 2-points, consequently prior to this date drop-goals were often not explicitly documented, therefore '0' drop-goals may indicate drop-goals not recorded, rather than no drop-goals scored. In addition, prior to the 1949–50 season, the archaic field-goal was also still a valid means of scoring points.

Club records
Ted Bateson extended the 'most tries in a season' record for Wakefield Trinity with 26-tries scored in the 1928–29 season, and 27-tries scored in the 1929–30 season, this record was extended by Freddie Smart to 29-tries in the 1931–32 season. Ted Bateson is twelfth on Wakefield Trinity's all time try scoring list.

References

External links

Search for "Bateson" at rugbyleagueproject.org
 (archived by web.archive.org) Statistics at cricketarchive.com

1902 births
1972 deaths
Association football outside forwards
Blackburn Rovers F.C. players
English footballers
English rugby league players
English rugby union players
Lancashire cricketers
People from Settle, North Yorkshire
Rugby league players from Yorkshire
Rugby league wingers
Rugby union wings
Skipton RFC players
Wakefield Trinity players
Yorkshire County RFU players